Mogilev State A. Kuleshov University  is a regional educational and scientific centre situated  in Mogilev city, Belarus. Mogilev Republic A. Kuleshov University was founded in 1913. The first president of Belarus Alexander Lukashenko was among the graduates of the university, as well as the Heroes of Soviet Union and the Heroes of Socialist Labour, more than 300 Honoured Teachers and outstanding workers of the country's system of education,  scientists, writers, state and public figures, sportsmen – The World, Europe, and Olympic champions. Today the university is a scientific, educational and cultural center and provides education for the preparation of professionals and researchers in various scientific fields.

Administration 
Rector:  Denis Duk, Doctor of History, professor.
First pro-rector:  Dmitriy Lavrinovich, Doctor of History, professor.
Pro-rector for education:  Oleg Dyachenko, Ph.D. in philosophy, Docent
Pro-rector for education:  Vladimir Yasev, Ph.D. in political science, associate professor
Pro-rector for scientific work:  Natalia Makovskaja, Doctor of Economic Sciences, professor.
 The Head of International Relations Department: Sergei Machekin

History

1913, July 1 - a teacher institute was opened in Mogilev
1916, 33 teachers graduated for the first time. The school had 8 teachers at the time.
1918, December - the teacher's institute was transformed into a pedagogical institute, a higher educational institution with a four-year term of study
1923 – the pedagogical institute was temporarily closed
1930 – Mogilev State Pedagogical Institute was recreated with two branches in its structure - historical-economic and literary-linguistic. 
1941-1944 – training at the institute was interrupted by the Great Patriotic War
1944 - after the liberation of the city, Mogilev Pedagogical Institute resumed its work
1990 – the Faculty of Biology was founded (now - Faculty of Mathematics and Natural Sciences)
1997 - Mogilev State Pedagogical Institute named after A. A. Kuleshov was transformed into Mogilev State A.Kuleshov University
1998 - The Faculty of Economics and Law and the Faculty of Foreign Languages were opened

University structure

The university includes 7 faculties:
 Mathematics and Natural Sciences
 Foreign Languages
 History and Philology
 Pedagogy and Psychology of Childhood
 Primary and Music Education
 Physical Education
 Economics and Law

Scientific activity 
By the Decree of the President of the Republic of Belarus of April 22, 2020 No. 136 “On entering on the Republican Board of Honour of the Winners of the Competition for 2019” among the scientific organizations, Mogilev State A.Kuleshov University was recognized as one of the winners.

The scientific activities of the university in 2019 were carried out in accordance with the Decree of the President of the Republic of Belarus of April 22, 2015 No. 166 “About the Priority Areas of Scientific and Technical Activity in the Republic of Belarus for 2016–2020”, and the List of priority areas for scientific research of the Republic of Belarus for 2016–2020 years, approved by the Decree of the Council of Ministers of the Republic of Belarus No. 190 dated 03/12/2015, and the thematic research plan approved by the University Council on 02/16/2019. 

The university is a member of the Association of Universities of the Border Regions of Belarus and Russia, the CSTO University League, the Eurasian Association of Pedagogical Universities. The university publishes the scientific and methodological journal “Bulletin of Mogilev State A.Kuleshov University” and the newspaper “University Bulletin”.

In addition, the university includes:
Institute for Advanced Studies and Retraining
Social and Humanitarian College
Goretsky Pedagogical College

Allegations of political repression against students  
According to a report prepared by the Polish Foundation for Freedom and Democracy, Konstantin Bondarenko, rector of the university, expelled students for their political activities.

Notable alumni 

 Alexander Lukashenko, the first president of Belarus
 Galina Lukashenko
 Alexander Radkov, former Minister of Education and Deputy Head of the Presidential Administration
 Mikhail Zimyanin, Soviet politician and diplomat who served as the editor-in-chief of the newspaper Pravda, the official publication of the Communist Party of the Soviet Union,
 Sergey Novikov, retired Belarusian biathlete
 Svetlana Baitova, Soviet and Belarusian gymnast, Olympic champion in 1988
 Igor Marzaluk, Belarusian historian, archaeologist, ethnographer, teacher. Doctor of Historical Sciences
 Igor Shklyarevsky, Soviet and Russian poet, translator. Laureate of the USSR State Prize

See also 
  Могилёвский Государственный Университет имени А.Кулешова
  A List of Modern European University
 List of Universities in Belarus

References 

1. ↑ The History of Mogilev State A.Kuleshov University (1913—1940 гг.): documents / written by.: A.G.Ageev, K.M.Bondarenko, V.P.Klimkovich — Mogilev: MSU named after Kuleshov, 2008. — 216 p.
2.↑ http://msu.mogilev.by The official web page of the University

External links
Official Website

Educational institutions established in 1913
1913 establishments in the Russian Empire
Buildings and structures in Mogilev